The 2005–06 Egyptian Super Cup was the fifth edition of the Egyptian Super Cup, an annual football match between the winners of the previous season's Egyptian Premier League and Egypt Cup. The match is usually contested by the winners of the Premier League and the Egypt Cup, Al Ahly won the 2004–05 Egyptian Premier League and ENPPI won the 2004–05 Egypt Cup. The match was played at the Osman Ahmed Osman Stadium in Cairo. Al Ahly won the match 1–0 at extra time, after the match finished 0–0 after 90 minutes.

Details

References

Egyptian Super Cup
2005–06 in Egyptian football
Al Ahly SC matches
ENPPI SC matches